A cumulonimbus capillatus is a cumulonimbus cloud with dense cirrus clouds which makes the cloud's top appear to contain hair-like structures. The name comes from the Latin, capillatus, meaning "with hair".

It is an intermediate stage between cumulonimbus calvus and cumulonimbus incus.

Hazards

A cumulonimbus capillatus is a mature and powerful cumulonimbus cloud and can produce multiple severe weather.

Lightning; this is a strong thunderstorm cloud and it is capable of producing bursts of cloud to ground and cloud to cloud lightning.
Hail; hailstones may fall from this cloud if it is in a highly unstable environment (which favors a more vigorous storm updraft).
Heavy rain; the cloud may drop several inches of rain in a short amount of time. This can cause flash flooding.
Strong wind; gale-force winds from a downburst may occur under this cloud.

References

Cumulus
Cirrus